Accentus (or accentus ecclesiasticus) is a Church music term.

Accentus may also refer to:
 Accentus Austria, early music ensemble led by Thomas Wimmer
 Accentus (choir), a French cappella classical music choir directed by Laurence Equilbey
 Accentus (fallacy), a fallacy of ambiguity, where the ambiguity arises from the emphasis (accent) placed on a word or phrase
 Accentus Music, a German classical music record label